Soma is a company that designs eco-friendly water filtration systems. It was founded by Mike Del Ponte, Ido Leffler, Rohan Oza, and Zach Allia in 2012.

History
Del Ponte received inspiration for Soma while hosting a dinner party. He was too embarrassed to display his plastic water filter on the table, and when he attempted to decant the water into a glass carafe, the lid flew off the pitcher and water spilled on the floor. While cleaning up the mess with a dinner guest, Ido Leffler (the founder of Yes To, Inc), the two resolved to create a water filter that is well-designed, functional, eco-friendly, and delivered via subscription.

Soma launched a Kickstarter campaign in December 2012. Within the first nine days they had raised over $100,000, with an eventual total of $147,000 by the end of the campaign.

In July 2013, Soma announced a $3.7 million seed round of funding, from investors including Baseline Ventures, Forerunner Ventures, Lerer Ventures, Collaborative Fund, Cowboy Ventures, Vast Ventures, Mindful Investors, and Tim Ferriss. Soma opened ordering to the public on September 16, 2013.

In November 2017, Soma was acquired by Full Circle Home, a home goods and cleaning supply company.

Description
The Soma water filtration system consists of a glass carafe and a biodegradable water filter. The carafe is contoured to fit hands and has a beveled edge to prevent spilling. The filters are made from Malaysian coconut shells, vegan silk, and food-based PLA plastic, and are delivered to customers via a subscription service every two months. The filter was designed by David Beeman, who created the water formulas for Starbucks and Peet's Coffee. Soma has also partnered with charity: water to donate clean drinking water to those in need through the sale of every filter.

Reception
The New York Times called Soma a "welcome change to the status quo" and Inc. Magazine named Soma one of the "most audacious companies of 2013." Soma has also been profiled in Wired, Men’s Journal, GQ, Forbes, Business Insider, Mashable, Details, Greatist, Gear Patrol, Thrillist, Good.is, and The Huffington Post.

References

External links
Soma Official Website
Soma on Twitter

Companies based in San Francisco
2012 establishments in California